The 2015 NC State Wolfpack baseball team represented North Carolina State University during the 2015 NCAA Division I baseball season. The Wolfpack played their home games at Doak Field as a member of the Atlantic Coast Conference. They were led by head coach Elliott Avent, in his 19th season at NC State.

Previous season
In 2014, the Wolfpack finished the season 5th in the ACC's Atlantic Division with a record of 32–23, 13–17 in conference play. They qualified for the 2014 Atlantic Coast Conference baseball tournament, and were eliminated in the play-in round. They failed to qualify for the 2014 NCAA Division I baseball tournament.

Personnel

Roster

Coaching staff

Source:

Season

February
The Wolfpack opened the season on February 13 with a game against , as part of a three-day tournament at home at Doak Field. Against Villanova, the Wolfpack jumped out to a 10–0 lead after two innings, 13–0 lead after six, and eventually went on to win by a score of 14–5. In the second game of the weekend, the Wolfpack faced . Preston Palmiero went 5-for-5 from the plate and the Wolfpack defeated the Wildcats, 8–3. The Wolfpack had a game scheduled for February 17 against , but it was cancelled due to impending weather.

Schedule

! style="background:#CC0000;color:white;"| Regular Season
|- valign="top" 

|- bgcolor="#bbffbb"
| February 13 ||  ||  || Doak Field • Raleigh, NC || 14–5 || Wilder (1–0) || Harris (0–1) ||  || 773 || 1–0 || –
|- bgcolor="#bbffbb"
| February 14 ||  ||  || Doak Field • Raleigh, NC || 8–3 || Mendoza (1–0) || Bain (0–1) ||  || 1,223 || 2–0 || –
|- bgcolor="#bbbbbb"
| February 15 ||  ||  || Doak Field • Raleigh, NC ||colspan=7|Cancelled
|- bgcolor="#bbbbbb"
| February 17 ||  ||  || Doak Field • Raleigh, NC ||colspan=7|Cancelled
|- bgcolor="#bbbbbb"
| February 20 || vs.  ||  || TicketReturn.com Field • Myrtle Beach, SC ||colspan=7|Postponed  Rescheduled for February 21
|- bgcolor="#ffbbbb"
| February 21 || vs. Albany ||  || TicketReturn.com Field • Myrtle Beach, SC || 6–9 || Ryan (1–0) || Wilder (1–1) || DeCelle (1) || 247 || 2–1 ||–
|- bgcolor="#bbffbb"
| February 21 || vs.  ||  || TicketReturn.com Field • Myrtle Beach, SC || 3–1 || Brown (1–0) || Mourelle (1–1) || DeJuneas (1) || 82 || 3–1 ||–
|- bgcolor="#ffbbbb"
| February 22 || at  ||  || Springs Brooks Stadium • Conway, SC || 3–12 || Hopeck (1–0) || Mendoza (1–1) ||  || 1,454 || 3–2 ||–
|- bgcolor="#bbbbbb"
| February 24 ||  ||  || Doak Field • Raleigh, NC ||colspan=7|Postponed  Rescheduled for February 25
|- bgcolor="#bbffbb"
| February 25 ||  ||  || Doak Field • Raleigh, NC || 9–1 || Stone (1–0) || Miranda (0–1) ||  || 225 || 4–2 ||–
|- bgcolor="#ffbbbb"
| February 27 || vs.  ||  || Grayson Stadium • Savannah, GA || 0–1 || Geoghegan (1–0) || Wilder (1–2) || Sherer (2) || 26 || 4–3 ||–
|- bgcolor="#bbffbb"
| February 28 || vs.  ||  || Grayson Stadium • Savannah, GA || 4–2 || Brown (2–0) || James (0–2) || Olczak (1) || 41 || 5–3 ||–
|-

|- bgcolor="#bbbbbb"
| March 1 || vs. UNC Greensboro ||  || Grayson Stadium • Savannah, GA||colspan=7|Cancelled
|- bgcolor="#bbbbbb"
| March 1 || vs. Charlotte ||  || Grayson Stadium • Savannah, GA||colspan=7|Cancelled
|- bgcolor="#bbffbb"
| March 3 || East Carolina ||  || Doak Field • Raleigh, NC || 7–0 || Britt (1–0) || Boyd (1–2) ||  || 456 || 6–3 ||–
|- bgcolor="#bbffbb"
| March 4 || Appalachian State ||  || Doak Field • Raleigh, NC || 6–4 || DeJuneas (1–0) || DeVrieze (1–2) ||  || 971 || 7–3 ||–
|- bgcolor="#ffbbbb"
| March 6 || Clemson ||  || Doak Field • Raleigh, NC || 4–6 || Crownover (3–0) || Wilder (1–3) || Moyer (2) || 496 || 7–4 ||0–1
|- bgcolor="#bbffbb"
| March 7 || Clemson ||  || Doak Field • Raleigh, NC || 8–3 || Britt (2–0) || Erwin (1–2) ||  || 1,508 || 8–4 ||1–1
|- bgcolor="#bbffbb"
| March 8 || Clemson ||  || Doak Field • Raleigh, NC || 14–6 || Piedmonte (1–0) || Koerner (2–2) ||  || 1,745 || 9–4 ||2–1
|- bgcolor="#bbffbb"
| March 11 || at #29  ||  || FAU Baseball Stadium • Boca Raton, FL || 9–5 || Olczak (1–0) || Monkman (3–1) ||  || 607 || 10–4 || –
|- bgcolor="#ffbbbb"
| March 13 || at #25 Miami (FL) ||  || Alex Rodriguez Park • Coral Gables, FL || 2–3 (10) || Garcia (2–1) || DeJuneas (1–1) ||  || 2,420 || 10–5 ||2–2
|- bgcolor="#ffbbbb"
| March 14 || at #25 Miami (FL) ||  || Alex Rodriguez Park • Coral Gables, FL || 2–9 || Sosa (3–1) || Brown (2–1) ||  || 2,836 || 10–6 ||2–3
|- bgcolor="#ffbbbb"
| March 15 || at #25 Miami (FL) ||  || Alex Rodriguez Park • Coral Gables, FL || 0–6 || Suarez (1–0) || Piedmonte (2–1) ||  || 2,502 || 10–7 ||2–4
|- bgcolor="#ffbbbb"
| March 17 || at UNC Greensboro ||  || UNCG Baseball Stadium • Greensboro, NC || 3–7 || Wantz (3–0) || Williamson (0–1) ||  || 977 || 10–8 || –
|- bgcolor="#bbffbb"
| March 18 || UNC Greensboro ||  || Doak Field • Raleigh, NC || 8–3 || O'Donnell (1–0) || Dulaney (0–2) ||  || 1,014 || 11–8 ||–
|- bgcolor="#ffbbbb"
| March 20 || at Boston College ||  || Pellagrini Diamond • Chestnut Hill, MA || 1–3 || Burke (1–3) || Wilder (1–4) || Dunn (1) || 214 || 11–9 ||2–5
|- bgcolor="#bbffbb"
| March 21 || at Boston College ||  || Pellagrini Diamond • Chestnut Hill, MA || 9–4 (15) || O'Donnell(2–0) || Poore (0–2) ||  || 267 || 12–9 ||3–5
|- bgcolor="#bbbbbb"
| March 22 || at Boston College ||  || Pellagrini Diamond • Chestnut Hill, MA ||colspan=7|Cancelled
|- bgcolor="#bbffbb"
| March 24 ||  ||  || Doak Field • Raleigh, NC || 14–0 || Williamson (1–1) || Stalzer (1–4) ||  || 884 || 13–9 ||–
|- bgcolor="#bbffbb"
| March 25 || North Carolina A&T ||  || Doak Field • Raleigh, NC || 16–5 || Orwig (1–0) || Garrett (0–1) ||  || 982 || 14–9 ||–
|- bgcolor="#bbffbb"
| March 27 || Pittsburgh ||  || Doak Field • Raleigh, NC || 14–5 || Wilder (2–4) || Zeuch (2–3) || Braband (1) || 431 || 15–9 ||4–5
|- bgcolor="#bbffbb"
| March 28 || Pittsburgh ||  || Doak Field • Raleigh, NC || 7–1 || Brown (3–1) || Sandefur (1–3) || DeJuneas (2) || 923 || 16–9 ||5–5
|- bgcolor="#bbffbb"
| March 29 || Pittsburgh ||  || Doak Field • Raleigh, NC || 9–2 || O'Donnell(3–0) || Berube (0–3) ||  || 1,134 || 17–9 ||6–5
|- bgcolor="#bbffbb"
| March 31 || vs.  ||  || BB&T Ballpark • Charlotte, NC || 10–6 || Williamson (2–1) || Horkey (1–2) || DeJuneas (3) || 8,147 || 18–9 ||–
|-

|- bgcolor="#ffbbbb"
| April 2 || #8 Florida State ||  || Doak Field • Raleigh, NC || 2–3 || Byrd (4–0) || O'Donnell(3–1) || Strode (9) || 1,528 || 18–10 ||6–6
|- bgcolor="#ffbbbb"
| April 3 || #8 Florida State ||  || Doak Field • Raleigh, NC || 0–1 || Carlton (2–1) || Brown (3–2) || Strode (10) || 2,201 || 18–11 ||6–7
|- bgcolor="#bbffbb"
| April 4 || #8 Florida State ||  || Doak Field • Raleigh, NC || 11–7 || O'Donnell(4–1) || Johnson (3–2) || Gilbert (1) || 1,838 || 19–11 ||7–7
|- bgcolor="#ffbbbb"
| April 7 || at Elon ||  || Walter C. Latham Park • Elon, NC || 5–7 || McGillicuddy (1–2) || Gilbert (0–1) ||  || 525 || 19–12 ||–
|- bgcolor="#bbbbbb"
| April 8 || at UNC Wilmington ||  || Brooks Field • Wilmington, NC ||colspan=7|Cancelled
|- bgcolor="#ffbbbb"
| April 10 || at  ||  || Boshamer Stadium • Chapel Hill, NC || 1–2 || Gallen (2–2) || O'Donnell(4–2) ||  || 3,942 || 19–13 ||7–8
|- bgcolor="#ffbbbb"
| April 11 || at North Carolina ||  || Boshamer Stadium • Chapel Hill, NC || 2–3 (10) || Kelley (3–1) || DeJuneas (1–2) ||  || 4,142 || 19–14 ||7–9
|- bgcolor="#bbffbb"
| April 12 || at North Carolina ||  || Boshamer Stadium • Chapel Hill, NC || 6–3 || Williamson (3–1) || Thornton (1–4) || Gilbert (2) || 3,835 || 20–14 ||8–9
|- bgcolor="#bbbbbb"
| April 15 || Charlotte ||  || Doak Field • Raleigh, NC || colspan="7" |Cancelled
|- bgcolor="#ffbbbb"
| April 17 || at Notre Dame ||  || Frank Eck Stadium • Notre Dame, IN ||0–2||  Smoyer (6–0)
||  Wilder (2–5)
||  Guenther (4)
||555||  20–15
||8–10
|- bgcolor="#bbffbb"
| April 18 || at Notre Dame ||  || Frank Eck Stadium • Notre Dame, IN ||4–2 (14)||  O'Donnell (5–2)
||Ruibal (0–1)||  ||||21–15||9–10
|- bgcolor="#ffbbbb"
| April 18 || at Notre Dame ||  || Frank Eck Stadium • Notre Dame, IN ||2–7||McCarty (3–2)||Williamson (3–2)||  ||1,230||21–16||9–11
|- bgcolor="#ffbbbb"
| April 21 || at East Carolina ||  || Clark–LeClair Stadium • Greenville, NC ||5–6||Voliva (2–0)||  O'Donnell (5–3)
||  ||3,821||21–17||–
|- bgcolor="#ffbbbb"
| April 24 || Virginia ||  || Doak Field • Raleigh, NC ||3–8||Jones (5–2)||Brown (3–3)||  ||1,759||21–18||9–12
|- bgcolor="#bbbbbb"
| April 25 || Virginia ||  || Doak Field • Raleigh, NC || colspan="7" |Postponed  Rescheduled for April 26 (doubleheader)
|- bgcolor="#bbffbb"
| April 26 (game 1) || Virginia ||  || Doak Field • Raleigh, NC ||4–3||  Gilbert (1–1)
||Doyle (1–1)||  ||937||22–18||10–12
|- bgcolor="#bbffbb"
| April 26 (game 2)||Virginia||  ||Doak Field • Raleigh, NC||5–3 (10)||  DeJuneas (2–2)
||Bettinger (3–2)||  ||1,113||23–18||11–12
|-

|- bgcolor="#bbbbbb"
| May 1 ||  ||  || Doak Field • Raleigh, NC || colspan="7" |  Postponed  Rescheduled for May 2 (doubleheader)
|- bgcolor="#bbffbb"
| May 2 (game 1)|| Longwood ||  || Doak Field • Raleigh, NC ||3–2||  O'Donnell (6–3)
||Jones (2–1)||  ||880||24–18||–
|- bgcolor="#bbffbb"
| May 2 (game 2) || Longwood ||  || Doak Field • Raleigh, NC||6–1||  Brown (4–3)
||Simpson (3–2)||Britt (1)||1,376||25–18||–
|- bgcolor="#bbffbb"
| May 3 || Longwood ||  || Doak Field • Raleigh, NC ||6–3||  Gilbert (2–1)
||Vick (2–6)||  DeJuneas (4)
||1,206||26–18||–
|- bgcolor="#bbffbb"
| May 5 ||  ||  || Doak Field • Raleigh, NC ||9–5||  Olczak (2–0)
||Meyer (0–1)||  ||2,204||27–18||–
|- bgcolor="#bbffbb"
| May 8 || at Wake Forest ||  || Wake Forest Baseball Park • Winston Salem, NC ||19–1||  Brown (5–3)
||Pirro (6–4)||  Orwig (1)
||1,263||28–18||12–12
|- bgcolor="#bbffbb"
| May 9 || at Wake Forest ||  || Wake Forest Baseball Park • Winston-Salem, NC ||3–2||  Gilbert (3–1)
||Dunshee (5–3)||  DeJuneas (5)
||1,411||29–18||13–12
|- bgcolor="#bbffbb"
| May 11 || at Wake Forest ||  || Wake Forest Baseball Park • Winston-Salem, NC ||9–6||  O'Donnell (7–3)
||Johnstone (2–4)||  Orwig (2)
||819||30–18||14–12
|- bgcolor="#ffbbbb"
| May 14 || Louisville ||  || Doak Field • Raleigh, NC ||3–4||Funkhouser (7–3)||  Williamson (3–3)
||  Burdi (8)
||2,252||30–19||14–13
|- bgcolor="#bbffbb"
| May 15 || Louisville ||  || Doak Field • Raleigh, NC ||3–2||  Brown (6–3)
||  McKay (8–2)
||  DeJuneas (6)
||1,987||31–19||15–13
|- bgcolor="#ffbbbb"
| May 16 || Louisville ||  || Doak Field • Raleigh, NC ||5–8||  Burdi (5–0)
||  DeJuneas (2–3)
||  ||1,591||31–20||15–14
|-

|- 
! style="background:#CC0000;color:white;"| Post-Season
|-

|- bgcolor="#bbffbb"
| 1 || May 21 || Notre Dame || || Durham Bulls Athletic Park • Durham, NC ||3–0||Brown (7–3)||Kerrigan (3–5)||Britt (2)||3,599||32–20||1–0
|- bgcolor="#bbffbb"
| 2 || May 22 || Miami ||  || Durham Bulls Athletic Park • Durham, NC || 5–4 (12)||  DeJuneas (3–3)
||Mediavilla (3–2)||  ||6,806||33–20||2–0
|- bgcolor="#bbffbb"
| 3 || May 23 || Virginia ||  || Durham Bulls Athletic Park • Durham, NC || 10–2||  Williamson (4–3)
||Bettinger (4–5)||  ||7,139||34–20||3–0
|- bgcolor="#ffbbbb"
| 4 || |May 24 || Florida State ||  || Durham Bulls Athletic Park • Durham, NC || 2–6||Biegalski (7–4)||  Piedmonte (1–1)
||  ||9,759||34–21||3–1
|-

|- bgcolor="#bbffbb"
| 1 || May 29 || Stony Brook || || Lupton Stadium • Fort Worth, TX ||3–0||Britt (3–0)||Zamora (7–3)||Gilbert (3)||  2,785
||35–21||1–0
|- bgcolor="#bbffbb"
| 2 || May 30 || at TCU || || Lupton Stadium • Fort Worth, TX ||5–4||Orwig (2–0)||Ferrell (1–3)||  ||4,009||36–21||2–0
|- bgcolor="#ffbbbb"
| 3 || May 31 || TCU || || Lupton Stadium • Fort Worth, TX ||2–8||Alexander (6–2)||Williamson (4–4)||  ||3,480||36–22||2–1
|- bgcolor="#ffbbbb"
| 4 || |June 1 || at TCU || || Lupton Stadium • Fort Worth, TX ||8–9 (10)||Trieglaff (3–0)||Britt (3–1)||  ||4,277||36–23||2–2
|-

|-
| style="font-size:88%" | All rankings from Collegiate Baseball.

Awards and honors
Andrew Knizner
 Perfect Game USA Pre-season First Team All-American
2015 All-ACC Baseball Second Team
Preston Palmeiro
2015 All-ACC Baseball Second Team
Jake Fincher
2015 All-ACC Baseball Second Team
Logan Ratledge
2015 All-ACC Baseball Third Team
Brian Brown
2015 ACC Baseball All-Freshman Team

References

NC State Wolfpack
NC State Wolfpack baseball seasons
NC State
NC State Wolf